Tadipaar  is a 1993 Indian Hindi-language romantic action film directed by Mahesh Bhatt starring Mithun Chakraborty,  Pooja Bhatt, along with Juhi Chawla in a special appearance. The super-hit songs of the film were composed by Nadeem-Shravan.

Synopsis 

Tadipaar is the story of Shankar, sentenced to live outside the limits of the city, due to a police case. One day he rescues Namkeen, a woman in distress from some hoodlums. She resembles the multi-millionaire Mohinidevi, who has gone missing. Shankar asks Namkeen to impersonate Mohinidevi to embezzle her wealth. Namkeen agrees to do so, but the question remains: where is Mohinidevi, and what will happen to Namkeen when she is found?

Cast 
 Mithun Chakraborty as  Shankar
 Pooja Bhatt as  Mohinidevi / Namkeen Twins Sister 
 Juhi Chawla as  Rajkumari - dream sequence (special appearance)
 Sadashiv Amrapurkar- Maharani, dream sequence (special appearance)
 Anupam Kher as  Kader
 Avtar Gill as  Kadak
 Gulshan Grover as  Johny
 Tiku Talsania as  Inspector Mathur
 Kunika as  Mohinidevi's secretary
 Makrand Deshpande
 Vikram Gokhale as  Mohinidevi's Mamaji
 Veeru Krishnan
 Gavin Packard as Maharani, Henchman - dream sequence (special appearance)

Soundtrack 

The music of the film was composed by Nadeem-Shravan and the lyrics were penned by Sameer. The soundtrack was released in 1994 on Audio Cassette & Audio Compact Disc in Tips Music, which consists of 8 songs. The full album is recorded by S. P. Balasubrahmanyam, Kumar Sanu, Alka Yagnik, Sadhna Sargam and Vinod Rathod.

External links 
 
 

1993 films
1990s Hindi-language films
Films directed by Mahesh Bhatt
Films scored by Nadeem–Shravan